"Father and Son" is a popular song written and performed by English singer-songwriter Cat Stevens (now known as Yusuf Islam/Cat Stevens) on his 1970 album Tea for the Tillerman. The song frames a heartbreaking exchange between a father not understanding a son's desire to break away and shape a new life, and the son who cannot really explain himself but knows that it is time for him to seek his own destiny.

Stevens sings in a deeper register for the father's lines, while using a higher one for those of the son. Additionally, there are backing vocals provided by Stevens' guitarist and friend Alun Davies beginning mid-song, singing an unusual chorus of simple refrains. 
In 2021, it was listed at No. 408 on Rolling Stone's "Top 500 Best Songs of All Time".

Origins

Cat Stevens originally wrote "Father and Son" as part of a proposed musical project starring Nigel Hawthorne, called Revolussia, that was set during the Russian Revolution, and could also have become a film; the song was about a boy who wanted to join the revolution against the wishes of his conservative farmer father. The musical project faded away when Stevens contracted tuberculosis in 1969. He was close to death at the time of his admittance to the King Edward VII Hospital in Midhurst, West Sussex. After a year-long period of convalescence in the hospital and a collapsed lung, the project was shelved, but "Father and Son" remained, now in a broader context that reflected not just the societal conflict of Stevens' time, but also captured the impulses of older and younger generations in general.

"Father and Son" received substantial airplay on progressive rock and album-oriented rock radio formats, and played a key role in establishing Stevens as a new voice worthy of attention. In 1970 it was only put on the B-side of Stevens' single "Moon Shadow" (Island Records).

Interviewed soon after the release of "Father and Son", Stevens was asked if the song was autobiographical. Responding to the interviewer from Disc, he said, "I've never really understood my father, but he always let me do whatever I wanted—he let me go. 'Father And Son' is for those people who can't break loose."

Speaking to Rolling Stone, Stevens has said he is aware that "Father and Son" and several other songs mean a great deal to a large number of fans. 
"Some people think that I was taking the son's side," its composer explained. "But how could I have sung the father's side if I couldn't have understood it, too? I was listening to that song recently and I heard one line and realized that that was my father's father's father's father's father's father's father's father speaking."

By 2007, Stevens (then known as Yusuf Islam) recorded the song again in "Yusuf's Cafe Sessions" of 2007 on DVD again with Alun Davies, and a small band playing acoustic instruments. The performance was presented in a video with two close camera shots of his wife and daughter, holding his infant grandchild.

In 2020, Stevens released a re-recorded version of "Father and Son". This version, which appears on Tea for the Tillerman 2, features the original recording of Stevens' vocals (at the age of 22) alongside the present-day voice of Stevens (age 72). The animated music video of "Father and Son" also pays homage to the original release by featuring video clips from the 1970 music video released 50 years earlier.

Charts

Certifications

Sandie Shaw version

A version of the song was released in 1972 sung by Sandie Shaw. It became her twenty-ninth and final single on the Pye Records label, which had given her a highly successful string of hits in the 1960s, making her the most successful British female singer of that decade.

Flaming Lips lawsuit
The American rock band the Flaming Lips released a song titled "Fight Test" on its 2002 album Yoshimi Battles the Pink Robots. "Fight Test" was thought to be so musically similar to "Father and Son" that it resulted in a lawsuit. Sony/ATV Music Publishing, representing Yusuf Islam, and EMI Music Publishing, representing the Flaming Lips, agreed to divide the royalties for "Fight Test" equally between the two parties following a relatively uncontentious settlement. Flaming Lips frontman Wayne Coyne claims that he was unaware of the songs' similarities until producer Dave Fridmann pointed them out.

In an interview with The Guardian, frontman Wayne Coyne stated:

Boyzone version

Irish boy band Boyzone released a cover of "Father and Son" in November 1995, reaching number two on the UK Singles Chart and number one on the Irish Singles Chart. The cover received a platinum sales status certification from the British Phonographic Industry. The cover was the 13th-best-selling single of 1995 in the UK. In Ireland, it became their fourth consecutive number-one single, and it found international success, peaking at number two in Australia, number 11 in France, and number 15 in Germany.

British magazine Music Week rated "Father and Son" five out of five, picking it as Single of the Week. They added, "The song that got the audience choking back tears during the recent tour is Boyzone's Christmas single. It's an emotional rendition of the Cat Stevens song – and will be massive."

Track listings
UK CD1
 "Father and Son" (radio edit) – 2:46
 "Should Be Missing You Now" – 3:20
 "Father and Son" (live)

UK CD2
 "Father and Son" (radio edit) – 2:46
 "Should Be Missing You Now" – 3:20
 "Should Be Missing You Now" (The Other Mix) – 4:40
 "Father and Son" (the album version) – 2:50

UK cassette single
 "Father and Son" (radio edit) – 2:46
 "Should Be Missing You Now" – 3:20

Charts

Weekly charts

Year-end charts

Certifications

Ronan Keating version

"Father and Son" was covered by Boyzone frontman Ronan Keating and released as the second of three singles from his greatest hits compilation album 10 Years of Hits (2004). The song features guest vocals from Yusuf Islam (Cat Stevens) in the form of a virtual duet. The song peaked at number two on the UK Singles Chart, becoming Keating's 11th top-10 single. Keating donated the profits from the single to the Band Aid Trust.

Track listings
UK CD1
 "Father and Son" – 3:21
 "When You Say Nothing at All" (Spanish duet with Paulina Rubio) – 4:20

UK CD2
 "Father and Son" – 3:21
 "Father and Son" (Metrophonic Mix) – 3:57
 "I Hope You Dance" (video CD-ROM)
 "Father and Son" (video CD-ROM)

Charts

Weekly charts

Year-end charts

Certifications

Johnny Cash versions
Johnny Cash first covered the track in 1974 for his 48th album The Junkie and the Juicehead Minus Me. This cover, titled Father and Daughter (Father and Son), was a duet with Rosie Nix Adams (with lyrics adjusted to adhere to the different subject matter).

A cover of Father and Son appeared on Cash's posthumous compilation release Unearthed (2003). This duet featured Fiona Apple, and retained the lyrics of the original.

In popular culture
Stevens' original recording is featured in the final scene of the 2017 film Guardians of the Galaxy Vol. 2. Peter Quill listens to the song during the funeral of Yondu, his surrogate father. Additionally, it has appeared on TV in Welcome to Wrexham (Season 1, Episode 17) and This Is Us (Season 6, Episode 3).

References

1970 songs
1972 singles
1995 singles
2004 singles
A&M Records singles
Boyzone songs
Cat Stevens songs
Fiona Apple songs
Irish Singles Chart number-one singles
Island Records singles
Johnny Cash songs
Polydor Records singles
Pop ballads
Pye Records singles
Rod Stewart songs
Ronan Keating songs
Sandie Shaw songs
Song recordings produced by Paul Samwell-Smith
Song recordings produced by Ray Hedges
Songs about fathers
Songs written by Cat Stevens
1970s ballads